The Regional Council of Calabria (Consiglio regionale della Calabria) is one of the twenty Regional Councils of Italy.

Geography
The Regional Council represents the Calabria Region of Southern Italy.

Calabria is located in the "toe" of the southwestern Italian Peninsula.

Description

The Regional Council of Calabria was established in 1970. It is based at the Palazzo Campanella in the city of Reggio Calabria.

Composition
The Regional Council of Calabria was originally composed of 40 regional councillors. The number of regional councillors increased to 42 in the 1995 regional election, to 43 in the 2000 regional election and finally to 50 in the 2005 regional election.

Following the decree-law n. 138 of 13 August 2011, the number of regional councillors was reduced to 30.

Political groups
The Regional Council of Calabria is currently composed of the following political groups:

See also
Regional council
List of presidents of Calabria

References

External links
Regional Council of Calabria

Government of Calabria
Regional
Politics of Calabria
Reggio Calabria
Calabria
1970 establishments in Italy
Government agencies established in 1970